Abdul Azeem (born 10 June 1960, Hyderabad, India) is a former cricketer.  He was the first player from the south zone and the seventh Indian to score a triple century in Ranji Trophy (1986 versus Tamil Nadu). In a 15-year career for Hyderabad cricket team. He scored more than 4000 runs in first class cricket.

In September 2014, Azeem was named coach of Hyderabad cricket team along with Noel David as Azeem's assistant while NS Ganesh as the fielding coach of the Hyderabad cricket team.

In November, 2018 Azeem left the Jr. Selection panel of the Hyderabad Cricket Players Association saying procedures are not being followed selecting the squad.

References

 Cricketarchive Profile
 Cricinfo Profile

1960 births
Living people
Indian cricketers
Hyderabad cricketers
Indian cricket coaches
Cricketers from Hyderabad, India